Ralpharia is a genus of hydrozoans belonging to the family Tubulariidae.

The species of this genus are found in Australia, Malesia and America.

Species:

Ralpharia coccinea 
Ralpharia gorgoniae 
Ralpharia magnifica 
Ralpharia multitentaculata 
Ralpharia neira 
Ralpharia parasitica 
Ralpharia rosetta 
Ralpharia sanctisebastiani

References

Tubulariidae
Hydrozoan genera